The 1912 United States presidential election in Mississippi took place on November 5, 1912, as part of the 1912 United States presidential election. Mississippi voters chose ten representatives, or electors, to the Electoral College, who voted for president and vice president.

Mississippi was won by the Princeton University President Woodrow Wilson (D–Virginia), running with governor of Indiana Thomas R. Marshall, with 88.90% of the popular vote against the 26th president of the United States Theodore Roosevelt (P–New York), running with governor of California Hiram Johnson, with 5.50% of the popular vote.

Mississippi was one of the states in the 1912 United States presidential election where the sitting U.S. president William Howard Taft came in fourth place due to the hatred of the Republican Party in the south.

Results

References

Mississippi
1912
1912 Mississippi elections